is a Japanese former professional footballer who played as a midfielder. He played for Japan national team.

Club career
Fukunishi was born in Niihama on September 1, 1976. After graduating from high school, he joined Júbilo Iwata in 1995. He played as defensive midfielder with Dunga in 1990s. After that, he became a central player in golden era in club history. The club won the champions at 1997, 1999 and 2002 J1 League. The club also 1998 J.League Cup and 2003 Emperor's Cup. In Asia, the club won the champions 1998–99 Asian Club Championship and the 2nd place 1999–00 and 2000–01 Asian Club Championship. After that, he played FC Tokyo (2007) and Tokyo Verdy (2008).

International career
In June 1999, Fukunishi was selected Japan national team for 1999 Copa América. At this competition, on June 29, he debuted against Peru. Although there were few his opportunity to play, he was selected Japan for 2002 FIFA World Cup and played five minutes as a substitute against Russia. After the 2002 FIFA World Cup, he became a regular player from 2004. At 2000 AFC Asian Cup, he played all six matches and scored two goals including first goal in final. He also played at 2005 FIFA Confederations Cup and 2006 FIFA World Cup. He played 64 games and scored 7 goals for Japan until 2006.

Career statistics

Club

International

Scores and results list Japan's goal tally first, score column indicates score after each Fukunishi goal.

Honors
Júbilo Iwata
 AFC Champions League: 1999
 Asian Super Cup: 1999
 J1 League: 1997, 1999, 2002
 J.League Cup: 1998
 Japanese Super Cup: 2000, 2003, 2004

Japan
 AFC Asian Cup: 2004

Individua
 J1 League Best Eleven: 1999, 2001, 2002, 2003

References

External links
 
 
 Japan National Football Team Database
 

1976 births
Living people
Association football people from Ehime Prefecture
Japanese footballers
Japan international footballers
J1 League players
J2 League players
Júbilo Iwata players
FC Tokyo players
Tokyo Verdy players
1999 Copa América players
2002 FIFA World Cup players
2004 AFC Asian Cup players
2005 FIFA Confederations Cup players
2006 FIFA World Cup players
AFC Asian Cup-winning players
Association football midfielders
People from Niihama, Ehime